Elections to Preston Municipal Borough council were held in November 1945.

Results

1945 English local elections
1945
1940s in Lancashire